The Pennsylvania Lawn Tennis Championships was a tennis tournament played at the Merion Cricket Club in Haverford, Pennsylvania. The first edition was held in 1894. It was part of the Eastern Grass Court Circuit, a series of grass court tournaments on the American Eastern Seaboard in the lead up to the U. S. National Championships which also included Rye/South Orange, Meadow Club, Newport Casino, and others.

The men's events were part of the Grand Prix tennis circuit from 1970–1974, before which they were amateur events. They were held on outdoor hard courts from 1970–72 and grass courts from 1973–1974.

Past finals

Men's singles

1results included on ITF website, but not ATP website

Women's singles

Men's doubles

Women's doubles

References

External links
 ATP results archive

Recurring sporting events established in 1894
1894 establishments in Pennsylvania
1974 disestablishments in Pennsylvania
Tennis in Pennsylvania
Defunct tennis tournaments in the United States
Grass court tennis tournaments
Grand Prix tennis circuit
Recurring sporting events disestablished in 1974
Montgomery County, Pennsylvania